118th Regiment or 118th Infantry Regiment may refer to:

118th Regiment of Foot (disambiguation), several units of the British Army
29th Commando Regiment Royal Artillery
118th Infantry Regiment (United States)

Union Army (American Civil War):
118th Illinois Volunteer Infantry Regiment
118th New York Infantry Regiment
118th Ohio Infantry
118th Pennsylvania Infantry

See also
118th Division (disambiguation)